A. K. Md. Ahsan Ali (known as Ahsan Ali; 1 May 1937 – 10 September 2019) was a Bangladeshi physician. He was notable for the integration of tuberculosis and leprosy with general health services and the introduction of Directly observed treatment, short-course (DOTS) for treatment of tuberculosis and MDT for leprosy. He received the Independence Day Award from the Government of Bangladesh in 2018.

Early life and education
Ali was born at Rupasdi village in Brahmanbaria district. He passed matriculation in 1952 from Rupasdi Brindabon High School and I.Sc. from Dhaka College in 1954. He obtained MBBS from Dhaka Medical College in 1961. He had DTCD from UK in 1965 and higher training in general medicine in 1966. He completed special training on TB management in 1976 and higher training on TB in 1980 from Japan. He received FCCP degree in 1984 and FWAIM Fellowship in 2002 from the United States. He achieved FRCPI from the Royal College of Physicians of Ireland in 2007 and PhD in integrated medicine in 2010 from the United States.

Career
Ali worked at the Dhaka Medical College as an associate professor of TB and Chest Diseases during 1966–1980. In 1980, he joined the National Institute of Diseases of the Chest and Hospital (NIDCH). He acted as the director of the institute several times. He was the first Bangladeshi to be appointed a member of the governing body of SAARC TB Centre in Nepal and later became the Chairman of the institute.

Death
Ali died on 10 September 2019 at the age of 82.

References

Further reading
 
 

1937 births
2019 deaths
People from Brahmanbaria district
Dhaka College alumni
Dhaka Medical College alumni
Bangladeshi pulmonologists
Academic staff of Dhaka Medical College and Hospital
Recipients of the Independence Day Award
Fellows of the Royal College of Physicians of Ireland